Haji Muhammad Nawaz Khokhar was a Pakistani politician from Islamabad, Pakistan.

Early life and career 
Nawaz Khokhar was elected as MNA thrice from his constituency NA-35 (Malakand) in 1985–1988, 1990–1993 and 1993–1996.
He was elected the deputy speaker of the National Assembly of Pakistan in 1999 and also served as Minister of Science and Technology. he was one of the richest men in all of Pakistan. He was brother of late Imtiaz Khokhar also known as Taji Khokhar and Afzal Khokhar. He died on 9 January 2021 due to cardiac arrest.

References

20th-century births
2021 deaths
Deputy Speakers of the National Assembly of Pakistan
Politicians from Islamabad
Year of birth missing